Ichrak Chaib (born 16 January 2001) is an Algerian boxer. She competed in the women's middleweight event at the 2020 Summer Olympics.

References

External links
 

2001 births
Living people
Olympic boxers of Algeria
Algerian women boxers
Boxers at the 2018 Summer Youth Olympics
Boxers at the 2020 Summer Olympics
21st-century Algerian women
Competitors at the 2022 Mediterranean Games
Mediterranean Games silver medalists for Algeria
Mediterranean Games medalists in boxing